Hadgaon is a town and a municipal council in Nanded district in the Indian state of Maharashtra. Kednarth Temple is located at Kedarguda village about 16 kilometres from the town and attracts pilgrims. Also there are religious temples of Lord Datta & Renuka at Datta Bardi and Ukhlai Ashram, Vitthal Mandir, Ganpati Mandir in old town. Hadgaon was main place of activist in Marathwada Mukti Sangram Led by Swami Ramanand Teerth. It has an average elevation of 1899 metres  .

Demographics
 India census, Hadgaon had a population of 58347. Males constitute 52% of the population and females 48%. Hadgaon has an average literacy rate of 65%, higher than the national average of 59.5%: male literacy is 73%, and female literacy is 55%. In Hadgaon, 16% of the population is under 6 years of age.

References

Cities and towns in Nanded district
Talukas in Maharashtra